Helen Catherine Knapp Markley Miller (December 4, 1896 – November 1984) was an American writer of historical and biographical fiction for children taking place in the Western United States.

Biography
Helen Markley Miller was born in Cedar Falls, Iowa. In 1919 she graduated from the Iowa Teachers College in her city of birth. Subsequently she worked as an English teacher until her marriage. She married journalist Martin Baxter Miller (May 30, 1900 – May 14, 1944), who became managing editor at the Idaho Statesman. After her husband died of a heart attack, she picked up teaching again.

In 1953 Doubleday published Miller's first book, Promenade All. In 1954 she graduated with a master's degree from Western State College of Colorado. Her masters' thesis, Let me be a free man, was about Chief Joseph. Like many of her books, it was a fictionalized biography.

After her graduate studies, Miller lived in McCall, Idaho and wrote 21 more books. All were published by major publishing houses. She was represented by literary agent Barthold Fles. Miller had taught at the University of Idaho.

Helen Markley Miller's only son, Andrew Markley "Mack" Miller, participated as a cross-country skier in the Winter Olympics of 1956 and 1960. Mack and his sport formed the inspiration to Mrs. Miller's sixth novel, Ski fast, ski long.

In 1966, Promenade all was published in German as Indianerblut (Indian blood).

Bibliography
 1953 - Promenade all (Doubleday)
 1957 - Dust in the gold sack (Doubleday)<ref>{{cite journal
  | year = 1957
  | volume = 4
  | page = 106
  | journal  = Junior Libraries
  | issn = 0000-0035
  | quote = Dust in the Gold Sack (Doubleday $2.95). Junior Literary Guild selection. Believable characters enrich a well-rounded narrative set in a gold-mining camp in the Northwest in the 1860s.
 }}</ref>
 1957 - Benjamin Bonneville, soldier explorer, 1796-1878 (Messner)
 1959 - Miss Gail (Doubleday)
 1959 - Thunder Rolling; the Story of Chief Joseph (Putnam)
 1960 - Ski fast, ski long (Doubleday)
 1960 - Woman doctor of the West, Bethenia Owens-Adair (Messner)
 1961 - The long valley (Doubleday)
 1961 - Westering women (Doubleday)
 1962 - The lucky laces (Doubleday)
 1962 - Sagebrush ranch (Doubleday)
 1962 - Striving to be champion, Babe Didrikson Zaharias (Kingston House)
 1963 - Blades of Grass (Doubleday)
 1964 - Kirsti (Doubleday)
 1965 - Ski the mountain (Doubleday)
 1966 - Julie (Doubleday)
 1966 - Lens on the West; the story of William Henry Jackson (Doubleday)
 1967 - Janey and friends (Doubleday)
 1968 - Beloved Monster (Doubleday)
 1968 - George Rogers Clark, frontier fighter (Putnam)
 1970 - The San Francisco earthquake and fire (Putnam)
 1971 - Jedediah Smith on the far frontier (Putnam)

Honors and awards
 1966 - Nominee for the Dorothy Canfield Fisher Children's Book Award with Kirsti (Ribsy'' by Beverly Cleary won)

References

External links

 Full text of Benjamin Bonneville, Soldier Explorer, 1796-1878 downloadable in several formats

1896 births
1984 deaths
20th-century American novelists
American women novelists
People from Cedar Falls, Iowa
People from McCall, Idaho
Writers from Waterloo, Iowa
University of Northern Iowa alumni
Western Colorado University alumni
Novelists from Idaho
20th-century American women writers
Novelists from Iowa